"I Could Be Persuaded" is a song co-written and recorded by American country music duo The Bellamy Brothers.  It was released in June 1990 as the first single from the album Reality Check. The song reached number 7 on the Billboard Hot Country Singles & Tracks chart. It was the duo's last Top 10 hit.  It was written by David Bellamy, Howard Bellamy and Don Schlitz.

Chart performance

Year-end charts

References

1990 singles
The Bellamy Brothers songs
Songs written by Don Schlitz
Song recordings produced by Emory Gordy Jr.
MCA Records singles
Curb Records singles
Songs written by David Bellamy (singer)
Songs written by Howard Bellamy
1990 songs